A J cut is a variant of a split edit film editing technique in which the audio from a following scene overlaps the picture from the preceding scene, so that the audio portion of the later scene starts playing before its picture as a lead-in to the visual cut. Also called an audio lead or audio advance.

The name of the cut refers to the shape of audio and video pieces of the second of two scenes cut together when it was done on analog film. This technique has been applied since sound film first appeared.

See also 
 Film transition
 Jump cut
 L cut
 Match cut
 Split edit
 Prelap

References

Cinematography
Cinematic techniques
Film editing